Edward Dowson may refer to two cricketers, who were father and son:

 Edward Dowson (cricketer, born 1838) (1838–1922), Surrey cricketer
 Edward Dowson (cricketer, born 1880) (1880–1933), Surrey and Cambridge University cricketer